Afroedura gorongosa is a species of African gecko found in Mozambique.

References

gorongosa
Reptiles of Mozambique
Endemic fauna of Mozambique
Reptiles described in 2017
Taxa named by Michael F. Barej